Kürkçü (also known as Sarıkavak ) is a village in Mut district of Mersin Province, Turkey. The population of the village was 425  as of 2012. Main agricultural product is olive.

References

Villages in Mut District